Dezfuli (local names: دزفولی [dezfuli] or دسفیلی [desfili]) is a Persian dialect spoken in Dezful in the province of Khuzestan in Iran. It constitutes a language with the Shushtari dialect, which is spoken in Shushtar, the adjacent city. The main difference between Dezfuli and Shushtari is in vowel pronunciation.

Personal pronouns

References

External links 
Colin MacKinnon, http://www.iranicaonline.org/articles/dezful-03-dialect

Persian dialects and varieties
Khuzestan Province